Division No. 4 is a census division in Alberta, Canada. It is located in the northeast corner of southern Alberta and its largest urban community is the Town of Hanna. The census division contains all of Alberta's Special Areas as well as the Municipal District of Acadia. Division No. 4 is the smallest census division in Alberta according to population.

Census subdivisions 
The following census subdivisions (municipalities or municipal equivalents) are located within Alberta's Division No. 4.

Towns
Hanna
Oyen
Villages
Consort
Empress
Veteran
Youngstown
Hamlets
Cereal
Municipal districts
Acadia No. 34, M.D. of
Special areas
Special Area No. 2
Special Area No. 3
Special Area No. 4

Demographics 

See also 
List of census divisions of Alberta
List of communities in Alberta

References 

D04